Anatol Markovich Zhabotinsky (Анато́лий Ма́ркович Жаботи́нский) (January 17, 1938 – September 16, 2008) was a Soviet biophysicist who created a theory of the chemical clock known as Belousov–Zhabotinsky reaction in the 1960s and published a comprehensive body of experimental data on chemical wave propagation and pattern formation in nonuniform media. The reaction had been discovered by Boris Pavlovich Belousov in the early 1950s. From 1991 until his death, Zhabotinsky was an Adjunct Professor of Chemistry at Brandeis University in Waltham, Massachusetts.

References

External links
 Zhabotinsky page at Brandeis
 

1938 births
2008 deaths
Russian Jews
Jewish scientists
Russian physicists
20th-century American physicists
Academic staff of the Moscow Institute of Physics and Technology
Lenin Prize winners
Soviet Jews
Soviet biophysicists